Housing Vermont is a not-for-profit syndication and development company founded in 1988. It creates rental housing intended to be permanent and affordable for Vermonters through partnerships with local organizations, public agencies and the private sector. It has produced more than 4,000 apartments in 131 different developments. It is headquartered in Burlington, Vermont.

It is Vermont’s largest developer of affordable housing.

History
In 2009, it employed 100 people.

Funding
As of 2008, it had raised $163 million for its projects.

In 2003, Housing Vermont formed the Green Mountain Housing Equity Fund with a total investment of $14 million from nine investors. The Fund’s dollars were spread out over nine projects and it provided an internal rate of return of 7.75%. This allowed the agency to finance projects in which it was not the co-developer.

Green Mountain Housing Equity Fund II was created in 2005 with total capital of $22 million. In all, commitments were made to seven developments, which created 232 new homes.

The agency's third offering closed in 2007 with a total investment of $25 million.

Organization
It has 16 managers for its properties, including the Vermont State Housing Authority. There are developments in all of Vermont's 14 counties.

It is managed by an 11-member board of directors. It has a staff of 21. It has a budget of nearly $3 million.

Key people include:
President - Andrew Broderick. Salary - $102,700
Vice President - Kathleen Cannon. Salary - $88,000.
Vice President - Kenn Sassorossi. Salary - $80,100
Vice President - Nancy Owens. Salary - $65,603.

References

Organizations based in Burlington, Vermont
Non-profit organizations based in Vermont
1988 establishments in Vermont
Affordable housing
Housing organizations in the United States